A promonocyte (or premonocyte) is a cell arising from a monoblast and developing into a monocyte.

See also
 Pluripotential hemopoietic stem cell

Additional images

External links
 
 "Monocyte Development" at tulane.edu
 Slide at marist.edu
  - "Bone marrow smear"
 "Maturation Sequence" at hematologyatlas.com (Promonocyte is in seventh row.)

Blood cells
Immune system